Kol is a Munda language spoken by a minority in Bangladesh. Kim (2010) considers Kol and Koda to be Mundari cluster languages. Kol villages include Babudaing in Rajshahi Division, Bangladesh, while Koda-speaking villages include Kundang and Krishnupur.

References

Munda languages

Languages of Bangladesh